Denis Aleksandrovich Shvidki (born November 21, 1980) is a Ukrainian-born Russian former professional ice hockey right wing who played 76 games in the National Hockey League (NHL) with the Florida Panthers. He was drafted in the first round, 12th overall, by the Panthers in the 1999 NHL Entry Draft.

Playing career
As a youth, he played in the 1994 Quebec International Pee-Wee Hockey Tournament with a team from Kharkiv.

After playing two seasons with the Russian Superleague's Torpedo Yaroslavl, Shvidki made his North American debut with the Barrie Colts of the Ontario Hockey League in the 1998–99 season.  After two seasons with the Colts, he joined the Panthers' American Hockey League affiliate, the Louisville Panthers, in the 2000–01 season.  He also appeared in 43 NHL games with the Panthers that season, scoring six goals and adding ten assists.

After three more seasons split between Florida and its minor league affiliates, Shvidki returned to Russia during the 2004–05 NHL lockout and has played there since. Shvidki was reported to transfer to Kärpät Oulu (Finland) in October 2009 for the rest of the season, however after one month try-out, Shvidki was released.

Shvidki played a single season in 2012–13, his third in the DEL, with the Hannover Scorpions before signing a one-year contract with 2nd Bundesliga club, Heilbronner Falken on May 21, 2013. He was released by the club before appearing with the Falken's and completed his professional career in the lower Russian league.

In mid 2015, Shvidki joined the Florida Jr. Panthers hockey club and is still coaching under that organization as of end of the 2016–17 season.

Career statistics

Regular season and playoffs

International

Awards and honours

References

External links

1980 births
Amur Khabarovsk players
Barrie Colts players
Expatriate ice hockey players in Russia
Florida Panthers draft picks
Florida Panthers players
Hannover Scorpions players
Krefeld Pinguine players
Living people
Lokomotiv Yaroslavl players
Louisville Panthers players
National Hockey League first-round draft picks
Oulun Kärpät players
San Antonio Rampage players
HC Sibir Novosibirsk players
SKA Saint Petersburg players
Sportspeople from Kharkiv
Ukrainian ice hockey right wingers
Utah Grizzlies (AHL) players
HC Yugra players